Kedoya Utara (Indonesian for North Kedoya) is an administrative village in the Kebon Jeruk district, city of West Jakarta, Indonesia. It has postal code of 11520, the same as Kedoya Selatan.

See also 
 Kebon Jeruk
 List of administrative villages of Jakarta

References

http://www.idjakarta.com/barat/kebonjeruk/kedoyaselatan/kodepos11520.html

Administrative villages in Jakarta
West Jakarta